The Ahmet Kaya Kurdish Cultural Centre (French: Centre culturel kurde Ahmet-Kaya; Kurdish, Kurmanji: Navenda çanda Kurd a Ahmet Kaya) is a Kurdish cultural center located in on  in the 10th arrondissement of Paris, France. Established in Paris on 10 May 2001, the Ahmet Kaya Kurdish Cultural Centre promotes Kurdish culture, language, and the integration of Kurds in France.

History
The center is located in the 10th arrondissement of Paris, at 16 Rue d'Enghien. The center is named posthumously in honor of the Turkish-Kurdish folk singer and composer, Ahmet Kaya, who was the son of a Kurdish father and Turkish mother. Kaya died of a heart attack on 16 November 2000 while living in exile from Turkey.

On 23 December 2022, the Ahmet Kaya Kurdish Cultural Centre was the target of a mass shooting attack. Three people were killed in the attack on the center and two adjoining Kurdish businesses, a hairdressing salon and the Avesta Cuisine Traditionnelle Kurde restaurant on Rue d'Enghien.

References

Kurdish culture in France
10th arrondissement of Paris
Buildings and structures in the 10th arrondissement of Paris
Cultural organizations based in France
Organizations based in Paris
2001 establishments in France

ckb:ناوەندی کەلتووریی کوردیی ئەحمەد کایا
fr:Centre culturel kurde Ahmet-Kaya
ku:Navenda Çanda Kurd a Ahmet Kaya